The white-browed purpletuft (Iodopleura isabellae) is a small South American species of bird in the family Tityridae. It has traditionally been placed in the cotinga family, but evidence strongly suggest it is better placed in Tityridae, where now placed by SACC. It is found in the canopy of the western and southern Amazon Rainforest.

References

white-browed purpletuft
Birds of the Amazon Basin
white-browed purpletuft
Taxonomy articles created by Polbot